Nenu Local is a 2017 Indian Telugu-language romantic action comedy film directed by Trinadha Rao Nakkina who wrote the film with Prasanna Kumar Bezawada. Produced by Dil Raju under banner Sri Venkateswara Creations, It stars Nani, Keerthy Suresh and Naveen Chandra. Music was composed by Devi Sri Prasad. 

Released on 3 February 2017, Nenu Local was commercially successful at the box office. The film is remade in Bengali in 2018 as Total Dadagiri and in Odia as Local Toka Love Choka.

Plot
Babu is a college graduate with a carefree attitude, who makes an exam supervisor help him pass the exam. After completing his exam, Babu falls for his classmate Keerthy and pursues her to accept his love. After many attempts, Keerthy falls for Babu after he helps her friend Paddu reunite with her fiancé. However, Babu's happiness is short-lived when he learns that Keerthy is engaged to SI Siddharth Varma. 

Siddhu had fell in love with Keerthy and meets her father, who tells Siddhu to achieve something in life. After getting selected as the SI. Keerthy's father agrees to the proposal. Keerthy tells Babu to make her father accept him as his son-in-law. However, trouble ensues where it is revealed that Keerthy's father is the same exam supervisor, who rejects him due to his carefree nature. Keerthy helps Babu to apply for a job, but Babu refuses which leads Keerthy to breakup with Babu. 

On the day of the wedding, The bride's father (Paddu's fiancé's ex father-in-law) arrives and demands to call his son-in-law. Siddhu and Babu arrive where the bride's father aims a shotgun at Babu to kill him. In front of his impending death, Babu convinces the bride's father that his daughter could never be happy after her marriage because his daughter's fiancé loved Paddu. Keerthy's father criticize Babu's speech and taunts to shoot himself. 

Babu shoots himself with the bride's father's shotgun and gets severely injured where he is rushed to the hospital and Keerthy's father is convinced about Babu and Keerthy's relationship and accepts. Few months later, Babu and Keerthy completes their graduation where they get married. Babu participates in local elections and gets elected as the Corporator with huge majority of his constituency, while Siddhu asks his father to find out if his would-be doesn't have a boyfriend like Babu.

Cast

Music

Devi Sri Prasad scored the soundtrack, which was released on 14 January 2017 On Aditya Music.

Reception

Critical response 
123Telugu gave 3.25 out of 5 stars and wrote "Nenu Local is a likable love story which is aimed at the youth and mass audience. Today’s younger generation will surely connect to Nani’s character and performance which is the biggest highlight of the film. If you ignore the routine story line and predictable proceedings, this film has decent fun, good songs and some light hearted entertainment which makes up for a good time pass watch this weekend." 

Srividya Palarpathi of The Times of India gave 2.5 out of 5 stars and wrote "Nenu Local is incredibly predictable. If not for Nani’s comedy timing and skill to keep audiences glued to the seats, the movie would have had nothing much to offer. Set that aside, and it would border on boring. Nenu Local rides on Nani and nothing more." 

Idlebrain gave 3 out of 5 stars and wrote "Plus points are Nani, entertainment and dialogues. On the flipside, story is routine and screenplay is predictable. Nani has single handedly carried the film with his performance. On a whole, Nenu Local provides entertainment despite being routine."

Box office
The film grossed ₹24 crore at the worldwide box office in its opening weekend. By the end of its run, it was declared a blockbuster, becoming Nani's biggest solo commercial success to date, beating his previous record set by Bhale Bhale Magadivoy. The movie subsequently became Nani's third film to gross $1 million in the US after Eega and Bhale Bhale Magadivoy.

The film was dubbed and released in Tamil as Naan Local and in Hindi as Super Khiladi 4 in 2018.

References

External links

2017 films
Indian action comedy films
Films scored by Devi Sri Prasad
2010s Telugu-language films
2017 action comedy films
2017 romantic comedy films
Telugu films remade in other languages
Indian romantic comedy films
Films directed by Trinadha Rao Nakkina
Sri Venkateswara Creations films